Mohan Kumar Vivekanand (born 1963), also known as Cyanide Mohan, is a serial killer who preyed on women looking for marriage. A Mangalore fast track court tried and convicted him for the murder of 20 women.

He was accused of luring women who were unable to pay dowry or were unable to find suitable husbands. He would kill them by giving them cyanide pills, claiming they were contraceptives, and rob them of their jewelry. He was charged with 20 murders and defended himself in court. He was sentenced to death in December 2013.

Apart from murder, he was also alleged to have been involved in bank loan frauds and forgeries. He was a primary school physical education teacher from 1980 to 2003.

See also
List of serial killers by country
List of serial killers by number of victims

References

1963 births
2005 murders in India
2009 murders in India
21st-century criminals
Indian people convicted of murder
Indian prisoners sentenced to death
Indian serial killers
Living people
Male serial killers
People convicted of murder by India
Poisoners
Prisoners sentenced to death by India
Indian prisoners sentenced to life imprisonment
Prisoners sentenced to life imprisonment by India
Crime in Karnataka